Issy is a given name. Notable persons with that name include:

 Issy Bonn (1903-1977), British actor
 Issy van Randwyck, English actor
 Issy Sharp (born 1931), Canadian hotelier and writer
 Issy Smith (1890-1940), British-Australian soldier
 Issy Wong (born 2002), English cricketer

See also
 GPSO 92 Issy, French women's football team